Naranjal is a city located in southern Guayas Province, Ecuador, near Azuay Province. It is the seat of Naranjal Canton, created in 1960.

As of the census of 2001, there are 53,482 people residing within canton limits. The city is communicated with Guayaquil and Machala.

Populated places in Guayas Province